Paperstorm is a European website created by the Mozilla Foundation in May 2017 that advocates for better copyright reform in the European Union by demanding that MEPs vote against content recognition technologies in Article 13 of the proposed copyright directive.
As of 12 May 2017, over 15 million leaflets have been sent to members of the European Parliament.

References

Mozilla
2017 establishments in Europe